ARIA Centar, formerly known as BBI Centar, is a shopping mall in the center of Sarajevo. It was opened on 6 April 2009. ARIA Centar was built on the site where Robna kuća Sarajka, a popular state-owned department store, stood during the time Bosnia and Herzegovina was part of SFR Yugoslavia. Construction was between 2006 and 2009. The four middle floors are also home to the headquarters of Al Jazeera Balkans.

469 parking spaces with video surveillance are located on three underground floors. The square in front of ARIA Centar is a meeting place for the citizens of Sarajevo. Many events are held on the Square such as an art performance, children's playrooms, workshops, concerts, graduations and sporting events.

The International Council of Shopping Centers awarded ARIA Centar with the ReStore Award. This distinction of European Shopping Centre Awards rewards both the developer and the local authority for a successful partnership  that delivers a sustainable result for the local and regional community. The European Shopping Center Awards are the supreme awards in European retail property.

In October 2022, BBI Centar was renamed to ARIA Centar.

Net floor area specification
Retail 
Office 
Restaurant 
Storage 
Parking 
Services

See also
List of shopping malls in Sarajevo

References

External links

Official website of residential complex Sarajevo Panorama, developed by ARIA Real Estate
Official website of ARIA Real Estate Ltd

Shopping malls in Sarajevo
Commercial buildings completed in 2009
Centar, Sarajevo